Ni Ping (born 15 February 1959) is a mainland Chinese film actress and TV host. Since the early 1990s, Ni shot fame for hosting CCTV New Year's Gala.

Filmography

References

External links

1959 births
Living people
Actresses from Qingdao
CCTV television presenters
Chinese stage actresses
Chinese film actresses
Chinese television actresses
20th-century Chinese actresses
21st-century Chinese actresses